Kamini Kaushal (born as Uma Kashyap, 24 February 1927) is an Indian actress who worked in Hindi films and television. She is noted for her roles in films such as Neecha Nagar (1946), which won the 1946 Palme d'Or (Golden Palm) at Cannes Film Festival and Biraj Bahu (1955), which won her the Filmfare Award for Best Actress in 1955.

She played lead heroine in films from 1946 to 1963, wherein her roles in Do Bhai (1947), Shaheed (1948), Nadiya Ke Paar (1948), Ziddi (1948), Shabnam (1949), Paras (1949), Namoona (1949), Arzoo (1950), Jhanjar (1953), Aabroo (1956), Bade Sarkar (1957), Jailor (1958), Night Club (1958) and Godaan (1963) are considered her career's best performances. She played character roles since 1963, and was critically acclaimed for her performance in Shaheed (1965). She appeared in three of Rajesh Khanna's films, namely Do Raaste (1969), Prem Nagar (1974), Maha Chor (1976), in Anhonee (1973) with Sanjeev Kumar and in eight films with Manoj Kumar namely Shaheed, Upkar (1967), Purab Aur Paschim (1970), Shor (1972), Roti Kapda Aur Makaan (1974), Sanyasi (1975), Dus Numbri (1976) and Santosh (1989). In the 2010s, she took brief but praised supporting roles in the action comedy Chennai Express (2013) and the romantic drama Kabir Singh (2019), both of which rank among the highest grossing Indian films.

Early life
Kamini Kaushal was born in Lahore. She is the youngest of two brothers and three sisters. She is the daughter of Prof. Shiv Ram Kashyap, Professor of Botany, University of Punjab at Lahore, British India (present-day Pakistan). Prof. Kashyap is widely regarded as the father of Indian Botany. Her father was a distinguished botanist who discovered six species of plants. She was only nine when her father died on 26 November 1934. She did her B.A. (honors) in English literature from Government College in Lahore. She got an offer to act in films through Chetan Anand in 1946 with Neecha Nagar.

Talking about her teenage years, she said in an interview, "I had no time to fool. I didn't have any crush. I was busy swimming, riding, skating and doing radio plays on Akashwani, for which I was paid Rs 10." When her elder sister died in a car accident, leaving behind two daughters, Kaushal had to marry her brother-in-law, B.S. Sood in 1948. She set up home in Bombay where her husband was a chief engineer in Bombay Port Trust. Her elder sister's daughters are Kumkum Somani and Kavita Sahni. Kumkum Somani has written a book for children on Gandhi's philosophy and Kavita Sahni is an artist. Kamini had three sons after 1955, Rahul, Vidur and Shravan.

In the 1950s, the couple lived in a spacious manor-type house "Gateside" in Mazagaon, which was allotted to her husband by BPT.

Career
Kamini had been a stage actress in Delhi during her college days from 1942 to 1945. She worked as a radio child artist with the name "Uma" in Lahore before the Partition, from 1937 to 1940. She said in an interview about whether she wanted to be an actress in her childhood: "I come from a very intellectual family. My dad, S. R. Kashyap, was a professor at Government College, Lahore and the President of the Science Congress. He'd written about 50 books on botany. Growing up, our family concentrated more on knowledge, but he never deterred us from doing anything we wanted as long as it was positive." Though she had no dreams of joining the film industry while being in college, she was a fan of actor Ashok Kumar. Once she said in an interview: "We were to perform for the war relief fund in college. Ashok Kumar and Leela Chitins were the chief guests. After the show we went to meet him. I thought of having some fun. As he stood talking to the students, I pulled his hair from behind."

Chetan Anand gave her the role of the leading heroine in his film Neecha Nagar. This movie was done by her before marriage and released in 1946. She quoted in an interview, when asked about why her name was changed from Uma to Kamini: "Chetan's wife Uma Anand was also part of the film. My name also being Uma, he wanted a different name for me. I asked him to give me a name beginning with 'K' to match with the names of my daughters Kumkum and Kavita." She won an award at the Montreal Film Festival for her performance in her debut film.
She quoted in an interview about how she got her debut film: "Ravi Shankar was new, he had not done music for anybody. It was Zohra Segal's debut. Uma Anand (Chetan's wife) was with us in college — we were together. Chetan had been teaching at The Doon School and got to me through my brother.".

After Neecha Nagar, she returned to Lahore, but offers started coming in, hence she used to come for shooting from Lahore. After her sudden marriage in 1947, she settled in Bombay with her husband. She became the first leading heroine to continue working as lead film heroine after her marriage as well. Kamini was one of the first well educated heroines (BA in English) in Hindi cinema. She learnt Bharatnatyam at Mumbai's Sri Rajarajeswari Bharata Natya Kala Mandir, where Guru T. K. Mahalingam Pillai, doyen among nattuvanars taught. Since 1948, Kamini Kaushal worked with all the top leading men of her time, such as Ashok Kumar, Raj Kapoor, Dev Anand, Raaj Kumar and Dilip Kumar.

In every film starring her as lead heroine, except when opposite Ashok Kumar, in the period 1947 to 1955, her name used to appear first in the credits before the leading hero's name appeared. Her pairing opposite Dilip Kumar was popular with audiences with box office hits such as Shaheed (1948), Pugree, Nadiya Ke Paar (1949), Shabnam (1949) and Arzoo (1950)). The popularity as an actress increased with Filmistan's Do Bhai (1947), aided by Geeta Roy's impassioned singing of songs such as "Mera sundar sapna", which, incidentally, was shot in a single take. Kamini was paired opposite Dev Anand in his very first success, Bombay Talkies' production Ziddi (1948), a light romance. The pair followed this up with Namoona. Kamini played the third angle to the Dev-Suraiya pair in Shayar. In Raj Kapoor's directorial debut Aag (1948), she did a cameo as one of his three heroines (Nargis and Nigar were the other two), whose relationship with the hero doesn't fructify. She also starred with Raj Kapoor in Jail Yatra.

Kamini Kaushal was the first lead heroine for whom Lata Mangeshkar ever sang for and it was for the film Ziddi in 1948. Kamini quoted in an interview: "Lata sang for me in Ziddi for the first time. That was the first time she sang for the leading lady in a film. Before that, she sang for actresses in supporting roles. Shamshad Begum and Surinder Kaur — whose voices had more bass — used to sing my songs. On the music credits on the record, Lata's name was not mentioned. Instead, it was mentioned that Asha sang the songs — Asha was my screen name (in the film Ziddi). That's why people thought I had sung it. The playback singers - Kishore Kumar and Lata Mangeshkar recorded their first duet - "Ye Kaun Aya Re" together in the 1948 film Ziddi.

Her other successful films as lead heroine in films from 1946 to 1963 include Paras (1949), Namoona, Jhanjar, Aabru, Night Club, Jailor, Bade Sarkar, Bada Bhai, Poonam and Godaan. Kamini became a producer and signed on then-matinee idol Ashok Kumar in Poonam and Night Club. She did lighthearted roles in Chalis Baba Ek Chor (1954) and also did serious tragedy genre roles in Aas, Ansoo and Jailor. In the Sohrab Modi-directed Jailor (1958), Kamini gave a goosebump-raising performance as Modi's wife, who is pushed towards adultery by his ruthless tyranny. Trilok Jetley, who adopted Premchand's famous story Godaan on screen, put his film on hold, while Kamini was pregnant with her second child, because he wanted to capitalise on the softness in her voice. Pandit Ravi Shankar composed the score for her first (Neecha Nagar in 1946) and last (Godaan in 1963) films as a heroine.

In 1965, she moved to playing character roles with a film called Shaheed. She made the transition from playing leading heroine roles to character roles very easily. Her performances were appreciated in Waris, Vishwas, Yakeen, Aadmi Aur Insaan,  Uphaar, Qaid, Bhanwar, Tangewala and Heeralaal Pannalaal. As a character artist she was a fixture in seven Manoj Kumar films - Shaheed, Upkar, Purab Aur Paschim, Sanyasi, Shor, Roti Kapda Aur Makaan, Dus Numbari and Santosh (1989). Kaushal has had a long stint in films with releases till 2014. She stunned audiences by playing a mercenary vamp with aplomb in the film Anhonee (1973). Kamini Kaushal played mother to Rajesh Khanna in Prem Nagar in 1974, and in Maha Chor in 1976, and as sister in law to Khanna in Do Raaste.

Dilip Kumar, in his biography, has admitted his attraction to her while they acted in films together, but Kamini rejected his proposal as she was already married to her elder sister's widower and was taking care of her elder sister's kids. Dilip said that she was his first love. Kamini quoted in an interview on this: "We were both shattered. We were very happy with each other. We shared a great rapport. But what to do? That's life. I can't dump people and say 'Enough now, I'm going!' I had taken on the girls. I wouldn't be able to show my face to my sister. My husband, a fine human being, understood why it happened. Everyone falls in love."

She made a popular puppet show broadcast on the national channel at the time, "Doordarshan", which ran for a year (1989 to 1991), and was the first such children's series in Hindi. She stepped into writing children's stories. Her stories used to be published in the children's magazine Paraag, featuring the antics of 'Bunty', and 'Chotbhai' and 'Motabhai' – who were all loosely based on her own son and his cousin contemporaries. She dabbled in television doing serials such as Chand Sitare on Doordarshan. In 1986, Kaushal made an animation film, Meri Pari.

She appeared in The Jewel in the Crown (1984), a popular British television serial, as Aunt Shalini.

Kaushal worked in the highly popular serial Shanno Ki Shaadi, on StarPlus. She played Bebe, the grandmother of Shanno, the main protagonist played by Divya Dutta. She also acted in Sri Adhikari Brothers' TV Serial Waqt Ki Raftaar (DD National).

She said in an interview: "I, along with only few Indian heroines like Saroja Devi, Bhanumathi Ramakrishna, Sowcar Janaki, Mala Sinha, Moushumi Chatterjee, Padmini and Sharmila Tagore were the few who got married early and had success in the film industry even after our marriages as well as led a happy married life."

Award
 1956: Filmfare Award for Best Actress: Biraj Bahu
 1964: BFJA Awards for Best Supporting Actress (Hindi): Shaheed
 2011: Kalakar Awards: Lifetime Achievement Award
 2013: Kalpana Chawla Excellence Award
 2015: Filmfare Lifetime Achievement Award
 2015: BBC's 100 Women.
 2020: Screen Award for Best Supporting Actress : Kabir Singh
 2020: Filmfare Award for Best Supporting Actress : Kabir Singh (Nominated)

Filmography

Bibliography

References

External links 
 

Living people
1927 births
Actresses from Lahore
Actresses in Hindi cinema
Indian film actresses
Indian television producers
Indian television actresses
Indian women television producers
Government College University, Lahore alumni
Kinnaird College for Women University alumni
Filmfare Awards winners
Filmfare Lifetime Achievement Award winners
Punjabi people
Screen Awards winners
Women television producers
BBC 100 Women
20th-century Indian women
20th-century Indian people
People from Lahore